McLarney is a surname. Notable people with the surname include:

Art McLarney (1908–1984), American baseball player
Terrence McLarney, American police officer

See also
McCarney